Frogger: Ancient Shadow is a platforming video game developed by Hudson Soft and released in 2005 by Konami as a sequel to Frogger's Adventures: The Rescue. It is based on the original 1981 Frogger arcade game, and contains similar hop-and-dodge style gameplay.

Story
One sunny morning, Frogger was taking a nap and was woken up by his friend Lily. Lily tells Frogger that something is going on in Firefly Swamp. The insects are frightened, and Lily saw a suspicious shadow lurking in the forest. Lily says she will be fine as long as there are not any last minute script changes.

After the first boss, Lumpy comes and finds Frogger at his fishing spot. When Lumpy is determined to catch the "Big One" and "have a big filet tonight", Frogger confesses "that he had caught the Big One". Frogger then tells Lumpy that weird things have been happening lately around Firefly Swamp, like the insects have been acting strange lately.

As Frogger meets the Little Lion in White Savanna Level 2, a scary monster came and stole the Amulet of Mastery, then Mr. Lion began acting strange and climbed the cliff and took off. The monster also used the Amulet of Mastery to make Mr. Lion and the other fairies act strange. Frogger decides to save Mr. Lion.

At White Savanna Level 3, Frogger sees a monster with a suit and a hood. He threatens to shoot an arrow at Frogger but he shoots a fairy instead. Luckily, Frogger was not hurt. The monster jumps off.

After defeating Mr. Lion, Frogger spots Finnius. Little Lion reunites with Mr. Lion. His family has guarded the Amulet of Mastery since ancient times, but it's been taken by an unknown person. Finnius admits he is responsible for the ancient documents to help save the Amulet. Frogger has gotten mixed up in some trouble once more.

Meanwhile, in Hidden Caves, Frogger confronts the monster again. He shoots an arrow but Frogger avoids it at first. After he shoots an arrow at Frogger, he explains that the place is not a place for kids. Frogger should leave if he wants to be safe, however, the monster leaves. Frogger infiltrates the mini-game called "Firefly Surfing" unharmed.

At the boss, Frogger meets the stranger along with Dr. Wani and his minions in TRIP. He noted that he has the Amulet of Mastery. Dr. Wani has no choice but to leave while the stranger shoots the Wani minions. He then takes off. Frogger is forced to defeat the minions in combat. After that, they swim away and Frogger catches up with Dr. Wani, stating that his strategy is as laughable as a one-legged squirrel.

Windows Version
Unlike the earlier releases in the series, Frogger: Ancient Shadow released on Windows as a plug-and-play USB game controller.

This controller was based on Net Jet technology, and when it was plugged in it would download the installer from remote servers managed by Oberon Media.
The installer would then install the game executable, without any of the game assets.
Game assets were downloaded during loading screens for the area about to be loaded.
This was presumably done so the amount of time it took to setup the game was near-zero, making it a truly plug-and-play experience.
However, since the servers hosting these files went offline sometime after July 2012, the game has been rendered unplayable and the assets lost.
There is an effort currently spearheaded by Highway Frogs to restore the game into a playable state.

Reception

Notes

References

External links
 Frogger: Ancient Shadow on Mobygames

PlayStation 2 games
Xbox games
GameCube games
Windows games
Platform games
2005 video games
Hudson Soft games
Frogger
North America-exclusive video games
Video games developed in Japan
RenderWare games
Multiplayer and single-player video games